William "Bashin' Bill" Barilko (March 25, 1927 – ) was a Canadian ice hockey player who played his entire National Hockey League career for the Toronto Maple Leafs. Over five seasons, Barilko won the Stanley Cup four times in 1947, 1948, 1949, and 1951. Barilko died in August 1951 in a floatplane crash during a fishing trip to Quebec. Barilko's #5 was retired by the Leafs. He was the subject of the 1993 single "Fifty Mission Cap" by The Tragically Hip.

Personal life 
Barilko was of Ukrainian descent and had a brother, Alex, and sister, Anne. He was engaged to Louise Hastings.

Professional career
In February 1947, Bill Barilko was called up to the Toronto Maple Leafs from the PCHL's Hollywood Wolves and played for Toronto until his death. He was assigned sweater #21 when he debuted for the Leafs. He changed to #19 for the 1948-49 and 1949-50 seasons. The #5 (which was retired by the Leafs) was worn by Barilko for only one season, 1950-51. During that span of five seasons, Barilko and the Toronto Maple Leafs were Stanley Cup champions on four occasions: 1947, 1948, 1949, 1951. The last goal ever scored by Barilko was in overtime against the Montreal Canadiens' netminder Gerry McNeil. The goal was the overtime game winning goal in Game 5 of the 1951 Stanley Cup Final (April 21, 1951).

Disappearance and death
On August 26, 1951, Barilko joined his dentist, Henry Hudson, on a flight aboard Hudson's Fairchild 24 floatplane to Rupert House in northern Quebec for a weekend fishing trip. On the return trip to Porcupine Lake, the single-engine plane disappeared and its passengers remained missing. The cause of the crash was deemed to have been a combination of pilot inexperience, poor weather and overloaded cargo.

Barilko is buried in Timmins, Ontario, Canada, at the Timmins Memorial Cemetery.

"Fifty Mission Cap"
The 1993 song "Fifty Mission Cap" by The Tragically Hip is about Barilko's death and the Leafs' subsequent Stanley Cup drought. The song has been credited as singlehandedly reviving Barilko's fame after he had lapsed into semi-obscurity; the song remains a staple part of the Leafs' warm-up playlist at every home game, and the Leafs have a framed, handwritten copy of Gord Downie's lyrics to the song in their private players' lounge. Whenever the band played the Air Canada Centre, Barilko's retired-number banner was always left in place during the concert, and when Downie died on October 17, 2017, the team incorporated Barilko's banner into its Downie tribute.

Honours
Barilko played in the 1947, 1948 and 1949 NHL All-Star Game, scoring a goal in the 1949 game.

Barilko won four Stanley Cups with the Maple Leafs in 1947, 1948, 1949, and 1951.

Until October 15, 2016, Barilko's #5 was one of only two numbers retired by the Maple Leafs (Ace Bailey's #6 was the other).

Barilko's story was published in the 1988 book Overtime, Overdue: The Bill Barilko Story, by John Melady, and the 2004 book Barilko — Without A Trace, by Kevin Shea.

In 2017, TSN aired the short documentary film The Mission, profiling a project to recover the remaining wreckage of Barilko's plane; the film took its title from "Fifty Mission Cap", and it thematically touched on the song's role in Barilko's story. The film received a Canadian Screen Award nomination for Best Sports Feature Segment at the 6th Canadian Screen Awards in 2018.

Career statistics

See also
 List of fatalities from aviation accidents
 List of ice hockey players who died during their playing career
 List of NHL retired numbers
 List of solved missing person cases
 Lists of sportspeople who died during their careers
 List of Stanley Cup Final overtime series winners
 Sports-related curses

References

External links
 
 Ron Boyd wreckage discovery
 

1927 births
1951 deaths
Accidental deaths in Ontario
Canadian ice hockey defencemen
Canadian people of Ukrainian descent
Formerly missing people
Hollywood Wolves players
Ice hockey people from Ontario
Missing person cases in Canada
National Hockey League players with retired numbers
Sportspeople from Timmins
Stanley Cup champions
Toronto Maple Leafs players
Victims of aviation accidents or incidents in 1951
Victims of aviation accidents or incidents in Canada